Sunkanmi Omobolanle is a Nigerian film actor and director.

Early life and career
He was born on March 1, 1981. He hails from Ilora, a town in Oyo State southwestern Nigeria.
He is the son of the veteran comic actor, Sunday Omobolanle, popularly known as "Papi Luwe".
He attended the Nigerian Military School before he proceeded to Olabisi Onabanjo University where he obtained a bachelor's degree in business administration. He married Abimbola Bakare in 2011.
He had featured and directed several Nigerian movies.

Filmography
Olaide Irawo (2007)
Gongo Aso (2008)
Kakanfo (2020)

References

Living people
Nigerian male film actors
Yoruba male actors
Male actors in Yoruba cinema
Olabisi Onabanjo University alumni
21st-century Nigerian male actors
Ogunmola family
Year of birth missing (living people)
Nigerian film directors
People from Oyo State
20th-century births